Jalan Sri Tanjung (Johor state route J132) is a major road in Johor, Malaysia.

List of junctions

Roads in Johor